Aegoceras is an evolutionary wound ammonite, with wide spaced ribs, from the Early Jurassic (England)  included in the Liparoceratidae and superfamily Eoderoceratidae. Related genera are Leparoceras and Beaniceras.

References
Notes

Weblinks
Aegoceras
 Donovan, Callomon and Howarth 1981. Classification of the Jurassic Ammonitina.  
Bibliography
 M. K. Howarth. 2013. Treatise on Invertebrate Paleontology, Part L, Revised, Volume 3B, Chapter 4: Psiloceratoidea, Eoderoceratoidea, Hildoceratoidea. Treatise Online 57:1-139

Early Jurassic ammonites of Europe
Hasle Formation
Liparoceratidae
Ammonitida genera